The Frank G. Bloom House or Bloom Mansion is located in Trinidad, Colorado, United States, which is within Las Animas County. The Bloom Mansion is a late 19th-century building meant to serve as the personal residence of its owner. The mansion is located in Trinidad's 300 block of Main Street and has been on the National Register of Historic Places since 1970.

History
Cattle baron and banker Frank Bloom and his wife Sarah had the mansion created in 1882. The building is constructed in a French style and used locally made bricks. The home is still decorated with an array of period furnishings including a horn chair and delicate porcelain figures.

Trinidad History Museum
Today the home is part of the Colorado Historical Society's Trinidad History Museum. The museum, which is encompassed by the El Corazon de Trinidad National Historic District, features several homes in one block, including the Bloom House, the Baca House, which is next door to the Bloom Mansion, the Santa Fe Trail Museum, which features historic artifacts and exhibits about the Santa Fe Trail and Trinidad's heritage, and historic gardens around the properties.

In cinema 
 Badlands (film)

References

Historic house museums in Colorado
Houses on the National Register of Historic Places in Colorado
Museums in Las Animas County, Colorado
History Colorado
Houses in Las Animas County, Colorado
National Register of Historic Places in Las Animas County, Colorado
Houses completed in 1882